The SNCF Class Z 9500 electric multiple units were built by Alsthom between 1982–1983. They are, together with the Z 9600 units, the dual-voltage version of the Z2 family. They are operated by TER Franche-Comté, TER Bourgogne and TER Rhône-Alpes.Many units still run in their original livery and have the original orange interior, although the first refurbished units with the unified TER-livery and AGC-style interiors are beginning to appear as of July 2007.

Z 09500
Alstom multiple units
Electric multiple units of France